Wrapper libraries (or library wrappers) consist of a thin layer of code (a "shim") which translates a library's existing interface into a compatible interface. This is done for several reasons:

 To refine a poorly designed or complicated interface
 Allow code to work together which otherwise cannot (e.g. incompatible data formats)
 Enable cross language and/or runtime interoperability

Wrapper libraries can be implemented using the adapter, façade, and to a lesser extent, proxy design patterns.

Structure and implementation 
The specific way in which a wrapper library is implemented is highly specific to the environment it is being written in and the scenarios which it intends to address. This is especially true in the case when cross language/runtime interoperability is a consideration.

Example 
The following provides a general illustration of a common wrapper library implementation. In this example, a C++ interface acts as a "wrapper" around a C-language interface.

C interface 
int pthread_mutex_init(pthread_mutex_t * mutex , pthread_mutexattr_t * attr);
int pthread_mutex_destroy (pthread_mutex_t * mutex);
int pthread_mutex_lock (pthread_mutex_t * mutex );
int pthread_mutex_unlock (pthread_mutex_t * mutex );

C++ wrapper 
class Mutex
{
     pthread_mutex_t mutex;

public:
     Mutex() 
     {
          pthread_mutex_init(&mutex, 0);
     }

     ~Mutex()
     {
          pthread_mutex_destroy(&mutex);
     }

private:
     friend class Lock;

     void lock()
     {
          pthread_mutex_lock(&mutex);
     }

     void unlock()
     {
          pthread_mutex_unlock(&mutex);
     }
};

class Lock
{
private:
      Mutex &mutex;

public:
      Lock(Mutex &mutex): mutex{mutex}
      {
            mutex.lock();
      }

      ~Lock()
      {
            mutex.unlock();
      }
};

The original C interface can be regarded as error prone, particularly in the case where users of the library forget to unlock an already locked mutex. The new interface effectively utilizes RAII (Resource Acquisition is Initialization) in the new  and  classes to ensure s are eventually unlocked and  objects are automatically released.

Driver wrappers

Cross-language/runtime interoperability 
Some wrapper libraries exist to act as a bridge between a client application and a library written using an incompatible technology. For instance, a Java application may need to execute a system call. However system calls are typically exposed as C library functions. To resolve this issue Java implements wrapper libraries which make these system calls callable from a Java application.

In order to achieve this, languages like Java provide a mechanism called foreign function interface that makes this possible. Some examples of these mechanisms include:

 Java Native Interface (JNI)
 Java Native Access (JNA)
 A foreign function library for Python
 Managed Extensions
 SWIG (Simplified Wrapper and Interface Generator)

Existing wrapper libraries 
Some examples of existing wrapper libraries:

 Pthreads for WIN32
 OpenGL Bindings for Python
 MySQL++
 JavaCV

See also
 Wrapper function
 Wrapper pattern
 Glue code

Computer libraries